The 2011 Chaozhou riot began on the night of Duanwu Festival June 6, 2011 in Guxiang Chao'an County, Chaozhou, Guangdong, People's Republic of China.

Background
On June 1 a wage dispute took place at the Huayi Ceramics Factory in Chao'an. A Sichuan migrant worker couple and their son surnamed Xiong, from Zhongjiang County Sichuan, went to the factory demanding unpaid wages of about 2,000 yuan.

The father argued with the boss of the factory and was hurt in the forehead.  His 19-year-old son Xiong suffered cuts to the feet and hands after being attacked by two employees of the factory.

The boss of the factory surnamed Su, surrendered Saturday and confessed to the crime. He owed 61 workers 800,000 yuan in unpaid wages. The other two suspects who carried out the attack were also arrested by the police.

Riot
By June 2 more and more Sichuanese people from nearby areas began gathering for a movement.  A few people in the beginning increased to thousands of people.

By June 6 a protest was held at Guxiang involving 200 migrant workers at around 10pm.  This turned into a riot with 18 people injured, 9 detained.  One vehicle was set on fire, 3 cars were destroyed and 15 cars were damaged during the clash.

The tension between Chaozhou (Teochew people) and Sichuan people have escalated to the point where the situation has been described as "Battle of Chaozhou".  Different community groups have come out to protect themselves.  There are fears of Sichuan citizens bombing their gas stations in Chaozhou.  And fears of Chaozhou people in Sichuan getting attacked.

See also
 2011 Zengcheng riot
 Regional discrimination in China
 Punti-Hakka Clan Wars

References

2011 in China
Protests in China
Chaozhou
Riots and civil disorder in China
History of Guangdong
Chaozhou